Afghan salad is a salad in Afghan cuisine that is prepared with the primary ingredients of diced tomato, cucumber, onion, carrot, cilantro, mint and lime or sometimes lemon juice. Salt and pepper may be used to season the dish. Additional ingredients may be used, such as bell peppers, parsley, radish and herbs, among others.

See also
 List of salads
 Shirazi salad

References

Afghan cuisine
Salads